Verna or Virna may refer to:

People
 Verna Aardema (1911–2000), American author of children's books
 Verna Bloom (1939–2019), American actress
 Virna De Angeli (born 1976), Italian former sprinter
 Virna Dias (born 1971), Brazilian retired volleyball player
 Verna Felton (1890–1966), American actress
 Virna Haffer (1899–1974), American photographer, printmaker, painter, musician and author
 Virna Jandiroba (born 1988), Brazilian mixed martial artist
 Virna Lindt, Swedish singer
 Virna Lisi, stage name of Italian actress Virna Pieralisi (1936–2014)
 Virginia Virna Sheard (1862–1943), Canadian poet and novelist
 Verna Allette Wilkins, author, founder of Tamarind BooksOC right
 Anna C. Verna (1931-2021), American politician
 Carlos Verna (born 1946), Argentine politician
 Mary Curtis Verna (1921–2009), American operatic soprano

Places
 La Verna, a locality associated with Saint Francis of Assisi on Mount Penna, Italy
 Verna, Goa, a village in the Indian state of Goa
 Verna, Florida, an unincorporated area in the United States
 Verna or Velna River, Romania

Other uses
 Hyundai Accent or Verna, a subcompact family car
 Verna: USO Girl, a 1978 made-for-TV movie starring Sissy Spacek
 "Verna" (30 Rock), a 2010 episode of the sitcom 30 Rock
 Verna, plural vernae, Latin term for a person born into slavery and reared within the household of birth
 Verna (film), a 2017 Pakistani film
 Verna Natural Mineral Water, a Ghanaian natural mineral water brand

See also
 Chiusi della Verna, a comune in the Province of Arezzo in the Italian region Tuscany
 Piana di Monte Verna, a comune in the Province of Caserta in the Italian region Campania